A number of steamships were named Setubal, including:

, a cargo ship in service 1890–93
, a Hansa A Type cargo ship in service in 1945

Ship names